The French Rugby Union Championship of first division 1912–13 was won by Aviron Bayonnais that beat SCUF in the final.

The tournament was played by 18 clubs.

Context 
The 1913 Five Nations Championship was won by Ireland, France was last.

Quarter of finals 
(March 16, 1913)

Semifinals

Final 

The last try was scored at the end of an action of Roger Mialle, future Artillery Commander, who passed the ball to Lucien Besset, future member of parliament, who passed again to Jules Cadenat who scored the try. The last will be the nation team coach after 1930.

Other competitions 

For second teams: Stadoceste Tarbais beat SCUF 11–3

For third teams: Stade Toulousain beat SCUF 8–0

For fourth teams: Stadoceste Tarbais beat Stade Poitevin 16-0

Sources 

Le Petit Var, 1913

External links
 Compte rendu de la finale de 1913, sur lnr.fr

Notes 

1913
Championship
France